Julie Fragar (born 1977) is an Australian painter and educator. She is the recipient of several awards in Australia, including the 2017 Ramsey Art Prize Lipman Karas People's Choice Award, and her work has been acquired by major collections, such as the Art Gallery of New South Wales and Queensland Art Gallery.

Life
Fragar was born in Gosford, NSW, in 1977.

Work 
Fragar has been exhibiting her paintings since the 1990s. Her art and research explores the relationships between painterly and personal languages, both biographical and autobiographical. Her paintings are composed as dense agglomerations of fragmented images, “not layers but many images knitted together in one go”. Fragar's earlier paintings drew on her own life and environment as subject matter, combining these with an interest in, and explicit reference to, Gustave Courbet's realism.

Her 2016 painting Goose Chase: All of Us Together Here and Nowhere, Kilgour Prize 2016 finalist and winner of the 2017 Ramsay Art Prize Lipman Karas People's Choice Award, explores the story of Antonio de Fraga, her first paternal ancestor to emigrate to Australia in the 19th century. Another painting in the same series, Antonio Departs Flores on the Whaling Tide, won the Tidal: City of Devonport National Art Award 2016. In 2017 she painted the official portrait of Anna Bligh, Queensland's first female premier.

She also won the ABN Amro Emerging Artists Award (2005) and  the Pine Rivers Art Award (2014), and has been included in the Moran Art Prize, the Archibald Prize, and the Gold Art Award.

References 

Australian women artists
Living people
1977 births
Archibald Prize finalists